"Amigas Cheetahs" is the fourth single from The Cheetah Girls 2 soundtrack.

Background and composition 
The single officially premiered on Radio Disney on August 25, 2006 and was released officially for digital download on September 3. The song was produced by Jamie Houston.

Vocals 
This song features Adrienne Bailon on lead vocals and ad-libs. Bailon has 3 verses with Raven-Symoné, Sabrina Bryan and Kiely Williams each having 1 verse. The song features Belinda. Belinda has one Spanish verse on the song. When live, Bailon took Symoné's and Belinda's verses. Bryan and Williams took Bailon's other verse.

Music video 
The Cheetah Girls did not shoot a video for the single because the song was from their film The Cheetah Girls 2 and was used to promote the movie. Because of that, the video for the song features clips from the movie and the girls dancing and singing in a special Barcelona music festival which is also a clip from the movie/musical. It premiered on August 26, 2006 on Disney Channel.

Charts

References 

Songs about friendship
2006 singles
Belinda Peregrín songs
The Cheetah Girls songs
Macaronic songs
Songs written for films
Walt Disney Records singles
2006 songs
Songs written by Jamie Houston (songwriter)